Gordon J. Keddie is a Scottish pastor and theologian of the Reformed Presbyterian Church of North America educated at George Heriot's School, the University of Aberdeen, the University of Edinburgh, Westminster Theological Seminary, and the Reformed Presbyterian Theological Seminary.  He served long pastorates in State College, Pennsylvania and Indianapolis, Indiana. He is best known for his extensive writings including many commentaries on books of the Bible that have been translated in multiple languages. His contributions to the Welwyn commentary series published by Evangelical Press, include eight volumes, providing commentaries on the biblical books of Numbers, Judges, Ruth, 1 and 2 Samuel, Amos, Jonah, Acts and the Epistle of James. He is also the author of a two volume work on the Gospel of John that is part of the Evangelical Press Study Commentary Series. Other works include treatments of the parables of Jesus, heaven, the book of Ecclesiastes, covenant theology, editing a collection of essays by 19th-century Reformed Presbyterian theologian James Renwick Willson, and various other contributions on topics in Reformed theology.

Works

Author
Even in Darkness - Judges: Judges and Ruth simply explained, Evangelical Press, 1985
Looking for the Good Life: The Search for Fulfillment in the Light of Ecclesiastes, Presbyterian and Reformed, 1991 
Practical Christian – Welwyn Commentary Series: James, Evangelical Press, 1993 
Dawn of a Kingdom (1 Samuel) (Welwyn commentaries), Evangelical Press, 1988 
Triumph of the King (2 Samuel), Evangelical Press, 1993 
Preacher on the Run (Jonah) (Welwyn Commentary), Evangelical Press, 1993 
He Spoke in Parables, Evangelical Press, 1994 
You Are My Witnesses-Acts: (Welwyn commentaries), Evangelical Press, 1994 
The Lord's Supper is a Celebration of Grace: What the Bible Teaches about Communion, Evangelical Press, 1999 
The Lord Is His Name: Studies in the Prophecy of Amos, Evangelical Press, 2000 
The Guide to Ecclesiastes, Evangelical Press, 2002 
John: Volume 1 Chapters 1–12 (Evangelical Press Study Commentary), Evangelical Press, 2003 
John: Volume 2 Chapters 13–21 (Evangelical Press Study Commentary), Evangelical Press, 2002 
Heaven (Et Perspectives), Evangelical Press, 2006 
According to Promise (Numbers), Evangelical Press, 2010 
Christ's Covenant and Your Life (Presbyterian & Reformed Life), Crown & Covenant, 2013

Editor
Willson, James Renwick, Political Danger Essays on the Mediatorial Kingship of Christ Over Nations and Their Political Institutions 1809–1838., Crown & Covenant, 2009

References

External links
Gordon Keddie's books on Amazon.com

Living people
1944 births
People educated at George Heriot's School
Alumni of the University of Aberdeen
Alumni of the University of Edinburgh
Westminster Theological Seminary alumni
Scottish Calvinist and Reformed theologians
20th-century Scottish writers
21st-century Scottish writers
20th-century Calvinist and Reformed theologians
21st-century Calvinist and Reformed theologians
20th-century Calvinist and Reformed ministers
21st-century Calvinist and Reformed ministers